The Thailand horseshoe bat (Rhinolophus thailandensis) is a horseshoe bat endemic to northern Thailand.

References

Rhinolophidae
Mammals of Thailand
Mammals described in 2009